In medicine, gonadal vein refers to the blood vessel that carries blood away from the gonad (testis, ovary) toward the heart. These are different arteries in women (ovarian vein) and men (testicular vein), but share the same embryological origin.

The termination of the two gonadal veins in an individual is usually asymmetrical, with the left one draining into the left renal vein, and the right one draining into the inferior vena cava.

Anatomy

Fate 
The left gonadal vein usually empties into (inferior aspect of) the ipsilateral renal vein proximally to where the renal vein crossing over the aorta.

The right gonadal vein typically empties directly into the (right anterolateral aspect of) inferior vena cava, joining it at an acute angle, some 2 cm inferior to the ipsilateral renal vein. Occasionally (in about 6% of individuals), it empties into the ipsilateral renal vein like its contralateral fellow.

Variation 
In the lower abdomen, there may be multiple vessels instead of a single gonadal vein. Sometimes, these vessels do not converge into a single unified gonadal vein superiorly, instead terminating as two separate vessels on either side.

Clinical significance 
Prolongued venous insufficiency of gonadal veins may lead to an increase in lower limb varicose vein formation in both sexes.

References 

Veins of the torso